Yaimara Aguilar Mena (born 19 July 1989) is a Cuban retired footballer who played as a defender. She has been a member of the Cuba women's national team.

International career
Aguilar capped for Cuba at senior level during the 2010 CONCACAF Women's World Cup Qualifying qualification.

References

1989 births
Living people
Cuban women's footballers
Cuba women's international footballers
Women's association football defenders
21st-century Cuban women